James Archibald Hardison (November 18, 1867 – July 18, 1930) was the husband of Adele Louise Schwarz and a member of the North Carolina Park Commission; Mount Hardison is named after him.   James graduated from the University of Maryland School of Pharmacy in 1890.  Afterwards, he returned to Wadesboro, North Carolina where he opened a pharmacy.  The Calvary Episcopal Church Parish House was dedicated in his memory in 1948 by Bishop Edwin Penick.

References

1867 births
1930 deaths